The Air Pirates is a 1920 German silent adventure film directed by and starring Harry Piel.

The film's sets were designed by the art director Albert Korell.

Cast
 Harry Piel
 Paula Barra
 Friedrich Berger
 Albert Collani
 Paula Cora
 Mary Marion
 Margot Thisset

References

Bibliography

External links

1920 films
Films of the Weimar Republic
Films directed by Harry Piel
German silent feature films
1920 adventure films
German adventure films
German black-and-white films
Pirate films
Silent adventure films
1920s German films
1920s German-language films